Sphaerodactylus torrei, also known commonly as Barbour's least gecko or the Cuban broad-banded geckolet, is a small species of lizard in the family Sphaerodactylidae. The species is endemic to Cuba.

Etymology
The specific name, torrei, is in honor of Cuban naturalist Carlos de la Torre y Huerta.

Habitat
The preferred habitat of S. torrei, is forest.

Description
S. torrei has "very small minute granule-like" dorsal scales.

Reproduction
S. torrei is oviparous.

Subspecies
Two subspecies are recognized as being valid, including the nominotypical subspecies.
Sphaerodactylus torrei spielmani 
Sphaerodactylus torrei torrei

References

Further reading
Barbour T (1914). "A Contribution to the Zoögeography of the West Indies, with Especial Reference to Amphibians and Reptiles". Memoirs of the Museum of Comparative Zoölogy 44 (2): 205–359. (Sphaerodactylus torrei, new species, p. 260).
Grant C (1958). "A New Gekkonid Lizard (Sphaerodactylus) from Cuba". Herpetologica 14 (4): 225–227. (Sphaerodactylus spielmani, new species).
Rösler H (2000). "Kommentierte Liste der rezent, subrezent und fossil bekannten Geckotaxa (Reptilia: Gekkonomorpha)". Gekkota 2: 28–153. (Sphaerodactylus torrei, p. 114). (in German).
Schwartz A, Henderson RW (1991). Amphibians and Reptiles of the West Indies: Descriptions, Distributions, and Natural History. Gainesville, Florida: University of Florida Press. 720 pp. . (Sphaerodactylus torrei, p. 541).
Schwartz A, Thomas R (1975). A Check-list of West Indian Amphibians and Reptiles. Carnegie Museum of Natural History Special Publication No. 1. Pittsburgh, Pennsylvania: Carnegie Museum of Natural History. 216 pp. (Sphaerodactylus torrei, pp. 162–163).

Sphaerodactylus
Endemic fauna of Cuba
Reptiles of Cuba
Reptiles described in 1914